The Laeken indicators is a set of common European statistical indicators on poverty and social exclusion, established at the European Council of December 2001 in the Brussels quarter of Laeken, Belgium. They were developed as part of the  Lisbon Strategy, of the previous year, which envisioned the coordination of European social policies at country level based on a set of common goals.

List of Laeken indicators
Most of these indicators are discriminated by various criteria (gender, age group, household type, etc.).

 At-risk-of-poverty rate
 At-risk-of-poverty threshold
 S80/S20 income quintile share ratio
 Persistent at-risk-of-poverty rate
 Persistent at-risk-of-poverty rate (alternative threshold)
 Relative median at-risk-of-poverty gap
 Regional cohesion
 Long-term unemployment rate
 Persons living in jobless households
 Early school leavers not in education or training
 Life expectancy at birth
 Self defined health status
 Dispersion around the at-risk-of-poverty threshold
 At-risk-of-poverty rate anchored at one moment in time
 At-risk-of-poverty rate before cash social transfers
 Gini coefficient
 In-work at risk of poverty rate
 Long term unemployment share
 Very long term unemployment rate

References

Economy of the European Union
Welfare economics